K.V. Woluwe-Zaventem, mostly known as Woluwe-Zaventem is a Belgian football club located in the city of Zaventem.

The club was founded in 1941 as Woluwe Sporting Club with matricule 3149. In 1993, the team merged with Wosjot Woluwe (matricule 8836, founded 1982) to form K.V. Wosjot Woluwe, with the matricule 8836 dissolving in the process. A last merger occurred in 2003, when the team merged with K.V.K. Zaventem (matricule 424, founded 1921 and dissolved in the merger) to form K.V. Woluwe-Zaventem.

Current squad
Updated 19 August 2014.

References

External links
 Official Website 

Association football clubs established in 1941
Football clubs in Belgium
1941 establishments in Belgium
K.V. Woluwe-Zaventem